There have been two baronetcies created for persons with the surname Hulton, both in the Baronetage of the United Kingdom. Both are extinct.

The Hulton Baronetcy, of Hulton Park in the parish of Deane and County Palatine of Durham, was created in the Baronetage of the United Kingdom on 23 December 1905 for the colliery owner and politician William Hulton, in honour of his services to local affairs in Lancashire. The title became extinct on the death of the fourth Baronet in 1993.

The Hulton Baronetcy, of Downside in the Parish of Leatherhead in the County of Surrey, was created in the Baronetage of the United Kingdom on 25 June 1921 for the newspaper magnate Edward Hulton. The title became extinct on his death in 1925. His illegitimate son Sir Edward George Warris Hulton was a magazine publisher and writer.

Hulton baronets, of Hulton Park (1905)
 Sir William Wilbraham Blethyn Hulton, 1st Baronet (1844–1907)
 Sir William Rothwell Hulton, 2nd Baronet (1868–1943)
 Sir Roger Bradyll Hulton, 3rd Baronet (1891–1956)
 Sir Geoffrey Alan Hulton, 4th Baronet (1920–1993)

Hulton baronets, of Downside (1921)
 Sir Edward Hulton, 1st Baronet (1860–1925)

References

External links
 The Times obituary of Sir William Hulton, 1st Baronet

Extinct baronetcies in the Baronetage of the United Kingdom
Hulton family